Madeleine Sánchez-Petel (born 10 May 1968) is a Dominican Republic former professional tennis player.

Sánchez was a singles bronze medalist at the 1986 Central American and Caribbean Games (CACGs) and also represented the Dominican Republic at the 1987 Pan American Games in Indianapolis, where she participated in both the singles and doubles draws. She has won a further four medals at the CACGs, including a mixed doubles silver in 1986 (with Rafael Moreno) and a women's doubles bronze partnering Joelle Schad at the 1990 edition in Mexico City.

Educated in the United States, Sánchez had a stop-start career for the Dominican Republic Fed Cup team. She debuted in 1990 and featured in three ties, then didn't appear again until 1997. In 2001, following a three-year absence, she played in the Fed Cup for the final time. From her 12 Fed Cup ties she won seven singles and two doubles rubbers.

Sánchez, who played collegiate tennis for Tulane University, featured in the occasional professional satellite tournament and was ranked as high as 548 in the world in singles. In 1994 she won both the singles and doubles titles of an ITF tournament in Marseille.

In 2005 she took over as the Dominican Republic's new Fed Cup captain.

ITF finals

Singles: 1 (1–0)

Doubles: 1 (1–0)

References

External links
 
 
 

1968 births
Living people
Dominican Republic female tennis players
Tulane Green Wave women's tennis players
Tennis players at the 1987 Pan American Games
Pan American Games competitors for the Dominican Republic
Central American and Caribbean Games medalists in tennis
Central American and Caribbean Games silver medalists for the Dominican Republic
Central American and Caribbean Games bronze medalists for the Dominican Republic
Competitors at the 1986 Central American and Caribbean Games
Competitors at the 1990 Central American and Caribbean Games